Kim Jae-hun, better known by his in-game name Fenix, is a South Korean professional League of Legends player who is the mid laner for Dignitas Academy.

Career 
Fenix began his professional career in 2013 by signing with the team "Eat Sleep Game". Fenix didn't catch his big break until singing onto Team Liquid in 2015. His stay there was rather brief and was dropped from Liquid at the end of the 2016 season. The legacy he created while there would cause Gold Coin United and Echo Fox to take an interest in him. Fenix was signed onto Echo Fox at the end of the 2017 season. Fenix would later be released at the end of the 2018 season, with little to no warning. This situation caused him to not have enough time to sign onto a new team. Fenix is later signed back onto Echo Fox, who ended up disbanding because of inner conflicts, thus leaving Fenix without a team once again.

Tournament results

Team Liquid 
 3rd — 2015 NA LCS Summer 
 3rd — 2015 NA LCS Spring
 4th — 2016 NA LCS Spring playoffs 
 5th — 2016 NA LCS Summer regular season
 5th–6th — 2016 NA LCS Summer playoffs

Echo Fox 
 2nd — 2018 NA LCS Spring regular season
 4th — 2018 NA LCS Summer regular season

References 

South Korean esports players
League of Legends mid lane players
Living people
Year of birth missing (living people)
Dignitas (esports) players
Echo Fox players
Jin Air Green Wings players
Team Liquid players
Place of birth missing (living people)